LAFB may refer to:
Langley Air Force Base
Laredo Air Force Base
Left anterior fascicular block
Luke Air Force Base